Isalonactis is a monotypic fungal genus in the family Roccellaceae. It contains the single species Isalonactis madagascariensis, a saxicolous (rock-dwelling), crustose lichen found in Madagascar. Both the genus and species were described as new in 2014 by Damien Ertz, Anders Tehler, Eberhard Fischer, Dorothee Killmann, Tahina Razafindrahaja, and Emmanuël Sérusiaux. The genus name alludes to both Isalo Massif, the type locality, and the phylogenetic relatedness to genus Lecanactis.

Isalonactis madagascariensis has a thin, smooth thallus lacking a cortex, and with fine surface cracks, sometimes to the point of being areolate. The photobiont partner is trentepholioid (i.e., green algae in the genus Trentepohlia). The lichen contains psoromic acid.

References

Roccellaceae
Lichen genera
Arthoniomycetes genera
Taxa described in 2014
Taxa named by Emmanuël Sérusiaux